The 2012 Belk Bowl was a post-season American college football bowl game held on December 27, 2012, at Bank of America Stadium in Charlotte, North Carolina in the United States. The eleventh edition of the Belk Bowl began at 6:30 p.m. EST and aired on ESPN. It featured the Big East Conference co-champion Cincinnati Bearcats against the Duke Blue Devils from the Atlantic Coast Conference (ACC), and was the final game of the 2012 NCAA Division I FBS football season for both teams. The Bearcats accepted their invitation after achieving a 9–3 record in the regular season, while the Blue Devils accepted theirs after achieving a 6–6 record.  This was the first Belk Bowl for both teams.

Teams

This was the first meeting between these two teams.

Cincinnati

The Bearcats finished in a four-way tie for the Big East title with a 5–2 conference record (holding the tiebreaker over the Syracuse Orange but behind the Rutgers Scarlet Knights and Louisville Cardinals).  After defeating the Connecticut Huskies in their season finale, the Bearcats accepted an invitation to the 2012 Belk Bowl. On Friday, December 7, 2012, Head Coach Butch Jones resigned from the University of Cincinnati to accept the head coaching position at the University of Tennessee. Assistant head coach Steve Stripling coached the Bearcats in the bowl game.

Duke

The Blue Devils are coming off their best season in almost twenty years; despite finishing fifth in the ACC Coastal Division standings with a 3–5 record, the ACC's lack of bowl-eligible teams enabled the Blue Devils to accept their invitation to the 2012 Belk Bowl.

This will be the Blue Devils' first bowl game since the 1995 Hall of Fame Bowl, in which they lost to the Wisconsin Badgers by a score of 34–20.

Game summary

Scoring summary

Statistics

References

Belk Bowl
Duke's Mayo Bowl
Cincinnati Bearcats football bowl games
Duke Blue Devils football bowl games
Belk Bowl
December 2012 sports events in the United States